The Town of Goondiwindi was a local government area of Queensland, Australia. It is on the Queensland-New South Wales border.

History

It was first proclaimed a municipality, the Borough of Goondiwindi, on 20 October 1888.

The Shire of Waggamba, also headquartered in Goondiwindi and managing areas to the north, west and east of the town, provided many functions in partnership with the Town, including libraries and area promotion.

In 1937, the Goondiwindi Civic Centre was erected as the town hall at 100 Marshall Street, Goondiwindi. It was designed by Addison & MacDonald and built by Thomas Charles Clarke. It was added to the Queensland Heritage Register on 9 July 1993.

On 15 March 2008, under the Local Government (Reform Implementation) Act 2007 passed by the Parliament of Queensland on 10 August 2007, the Town of Goondiwindi merged with the Shires of Waggamba and Inglewood to form the Goondiwindi Region.

Mayors
 1915: J. F. Gibson (for the 5th time)
 1927: James Dowling Hindmarsh

Population

References

External links 

Former local government areas of Queensland
1888 establishments in Australia
2008 disestablishments in Australia
Populated places disestablished in 2008